Agabus is a large genus of predatory aquatic beetles in the family Dytiscidae, proposed in 1817 by William Elford Leach and named after Agabus, an early follower of Christianity. The adult beetles are moderate-sized, 5 to 14 mm long. The genus is primarily Holarctic in distribution, with only a few species known from the Afrotropical and Neotropical realms. Three species of Agabus, namely A. clypealis, A. discicollis and A. hozgargantae are endangered according to the IUCN Red List. The division into subgenera is not widely accepted. However, a number of species groups are recognized after the works of David J. Larson and Anders N. Nilsson. The genus is probably polyphyletic or paraphyletic. In a recent study of mitochondrial DNA, Agabus was found paraphyletic with respect to several of the species groups of Platambus, a closely related genus in the tribe Agabini. Lately the taxonomy of the genus has been revised, and some groups of species were transferred from Agabus sensu stricto to other genera in the tribe Agabini.

Agabus contains the following species:

 Agabus abessinicus (Zimmermann, 1928)
 Agabus adpressus Aubé, 1837
 Agabus adustus Guignot, 1954
 Agabus aequabilis (Gschwendtner, 1923)
 Agabus aequalis Sharp, 1882
 Agabus aeruginosus Aubé, 1838
 Agabus affinis (Paykull, 1798)
 Agabus africanus Pederzani & Schizzerotto, 1998
 Agabus ajax Fall, 1922
 Agabus alexandrae Ribera, Hernando & Aguilera, 2001
 Agabus alinae (Lafer, 1988)
 Agabus ambiguus (Say, 1823)
 Agabus ambulator Régimbart, 1895
 Agabus amnicola (J.Sahlberg, 1880)
 Agabus amoenus Solsky, 1874
 Agabus ancillus Fall, 1922
 Agabus angusi Nilsson, 1994
 Agabus antennatus Leech, 1939
 Agabus anthracinus Mannerheim, 1852
 Agabus approximatus Fall, 1922
 Agabus arcticus (Paykull, 1798)
 Agabus aubei Perris, 1869
 Agabus audeni Wallis, 1933
 Agabus austinii Sharp, 1882
 Agabus bakeri (Zimmermann, 1924)
 Agabus basalis (Gebler, 1829)
 Agabus bergi Zaitzev, 1913
 Agabus bicolor (Kirby, 1837)
 Agabus bifarius (Kirby, 1837)
 Agabus biguttatus (Olivier, 1795)
 Agabus biguttulus (Thomson, 1867)
 Agabus binotatus Aubé, 1837
 Agabus bipustulatus (Linnaeus, 1767)
 Agabus blatta Jakovlev, 1897
 Agabus brandti Harold, 1880
 Agabus browni Kamiya, 1934
 Agabus brunneus (Fabricius, 1798)
 Agabus canadensis Fall, 1922
 Agabus caraboides Sharp, 1882
 Agabus cephalotes Reiche, 1861
 Agabus charon Wickham, 1912
 Agabus clavicornis Sharp, 1882
 Agabus clypealis (Thomson, 1867)
 Agabus colymbus Leech, 1938
 Agabus confinis (Gyllenhal, 1808)
 Agabus congener (Thunberg, 1794)
 Agabus congeneroides Lomnicki, 1894
 Agabus conspersus (Marsham, 1802)
 Agabus conspicuus Sharp, 1873
 Agabus corticeus Lomnicki, 1894
 Agabus costulatus (Motschulsky, 1859)
 Agabus coxalis Sharp, 1882
 Agabus crassipes (Fall, 1922)
 Agabus crypticoides Régimbart, 1895
 Agabus debilipes Régimbart, 1899
 Agabus dichrous Sharp, 1878
 Agabus didymus (Olivier, 1795)
 Agabus dilatatus (Brullé, 1832)
 Agabus discolor (Harris, 1828)
 Agabus disintegratus (Crotch, 1873)
 Agabus dytiscoides Régimbart, 1908
 Agabus elongatus (Gyllenhal, 1826)
 Agabus erytropterus (Say, 1823)
 Agabus faldermanni Zaitzev, 1927
 Agabus falli (Zimmermann, 1934)
 Agabus freudei Guéorguiev, 1975
 Agabus friedrichi (Falkenström, 1936)
 Agabus fulvaster Zaitzev, 1906
 Agabus fulvipennis Régimbart, 1899
 Agabus fuscipennis (Paykull, 1798)
 Agabus galamensis Nilsson, 1992
 Agabus glacialis Hochhuth, 1846
 Agabus glazunovi (Zaitzev, 1953)
 Agabus godmanni Crotch, 1867
 Agabus granulatus (Falkenström, 1936)
 Agabus gringo Larson, 2000
 Agabus griseipennis LeConte, 1859
 Agabus guttatus (Paykull, 1798)
 Agabus heydeni Wehncke, 1872
 Agabus hoppingi Leech, 1942
 Agabus hummeli (Falkenström, 1936)
 Agabus immaturus Larson, 1991
 Agabus inexspectatus Nilsson, 1990
 Agabus infuscatus Aubé, 1838
 Agabus inscriptus (Crotch, 1873)
 Agabus jacobsoni Zaitzev, 1905
 Agabus japonicus Sharp, 1873
 Agabus kaszabi Guéorguiev, 1972
 Agabus kholini Nilsson, 1994
 Agabus klamathensis Larson & Leech, 1989
 Agabus kokoosson Feng, 1936
 Agabus kootenai Larson, 1991
 Agabus labiatus (Brahm, 1790)
 Agabus laferi Nilsson, 1994
 Agabus lagabrunensis Schizzerotto & Fery, 1989
 Agabus lapponicus (Thomson, 1867)
 Agabus leptapsis (LeConte, 1878)
 Agabus lineatus Gebler, 1848
 Agabus lithax Riha, 1961
 Agabus lobonyx Guignot, 1952
 Agabus loeffleri Wewalka & Nilsson, 1990
 Agabus longissimus Régimbart, 1899
 Agabus luteaster Zaitzev, 1906
 Agabus lutosus LeConte, 1853
 Agabus mackenziensis Larson, 1991
 Agabus maderensis Wollaston, 1854
 Agabus mandsuricus (Guignot, 1956)
 Agabus margaretae Larson, 1975
 Agabus matsumotoi Satô & Nilsson, 1990
 Agabus melanarius Aubé, 1837
 Agabus moestus (Curtis, 1835)
 Agabus morosus LeConte, 1852
 Agabus mucronatus (Falkenström, 1936)
 Agabus nebulosus (Forster, 1771)
 Agabus nevadensis Hå.Lindberg, 1939
 Agabus niedzwiedzkii Lomnicki, 1894
 Agabus obliteratus LeConte, 1859
 Agabus oblongulus Fall, 1922
 Agabus obsoletus LeConte, 1858
 Agabus ommani Zaitzev, 1908
 Agabus pallens Poppius, 1905
 Agabus pallidus Omer-Cooper, 1931
 Agabus paludosus (Fabricius, 1801)
 Agabus parvulus Lomnicki, 1894
 Agabus perditus Scudder, 1900
 Agabus perssoni Nilsson, 1992
 Agabus phaeopterus (Kirby, 1837)
 Agabus philippensis (Zimmermann, 1924)
 Agabus picotae Foster & Bilton, 1997
 Agabus pisobius Leech, 1949
 Agabus poppiusi Nilsson, 2003
 Agabus pseudoclypealis Scholz, 1933
 Agabus punctatus F.E.Melsheimer, 1844
 Agabus punctulatus Aubé, 1838
 Agabus raffrayi Sharp, 1882
 Agabus ragazzii Régimbart, 1887
 Agabus ramblae Millán & Ribera, 2001
 Agabus rathbuni Scudder, 1900
 Agabus regimbarti Zaitzev, 1906
 Agabus reitteri Lomnicki, 1894
 Agabus rottensis Nilsson, 2001
 Agabus rufipennis (Gschwendtner, 1933)
 Agabus rufulus Fairmaire, 1859
 Agabus rumppi Leech, 1964
 Agabus ruwenzoricus Guignot, 1936
 Agabus safei Abdul-Karim & Ali, 1986
 Agabus sasquatch Larson, 1991
 Agabus semipunctatus (Kirby, 1837)
 Agabus serricornis (Paykull, 1799)
 Agabus setulosus (J.Sahlberg, 1895)
 Agabus sikhotealinensis (Lafer, 1988)
 Agabus sjostedti Régimbart, 1908
 Agabus slovzovi (J.Sahlberg, 1880)
 Agabus smithi Brown, 1930
 Agabus solskii Jakovlev, 1897
 Agabus strigulosus (Crotch, 1873)
 Agabus striolatus (Gyllenhal, 1808)
 Agabus sturmii (Gyllenhal, 1808)
 Agabus subfuscatus Sharp, 1882
 Agabus suoduogangi Stastný & Nilsson, 2003
 Agabus svenhedini (Falkenström, 1932)
 Agabus taeniolatus (Harris, 1828)
 Agabus taiwanensis Nilsson & Wewalka, 1994
 Agabus thomsoni (J.Sahlberg, 1871)
 Agabus tibetanus Zaitzev, 1908
 Agabus tristis Aubé, 1838
 Agabus turcmenus Guignot, 1957
 Agabus udege Nilsson, 1994
 Agabus uliginosus (Linnaeus, 1761)
 Agabus undulatus (Schrank, 1776)
 Agabus ungeri (Heer, 1847)
 Agabus unguicularis (Thomson, 1867)
 Agabus uralensis Nilsson & Petrov, 2006
 Agabus valdiviensis Gemminger & Harold, 1868
 Agabus velox Leech, 1939
 Agabus vereschaginae Angus, 1984
 Agabus winkleri (Gschwendtner, 1923)
 Agabus wollastoni Sharp, 1882
 Agabus xyztrus Larson, 2000
 Agabus yakutiae Nilsson & Larson, 1990
 Agabus zetterstedti Thomson, 1856
 Agabus zimmermanni Scholz, 1920

References

Further reading
Hilsenhoff, W.L. (1986) Life history strategies of some Nearctic Agabini (Coleoptera, Dytiscidae). Entomologica Basiliensia 11: 385-390.
Larson D.J. (1989). Revision of North American Agabus Leach (Coleoptera: Dytiscidae): introduction, key to species groups, and classification of the ambiguus-, tristis- and arcticus-groups. The Canadian Entomologist 121: 861-919.
Larson D.J. (1991). Revision of North American Agabus Leach (Coleoptera: Dytiscidae): elongatus-, zetterstedti-, and confinis-groups. The Canadian Entomologist 123: 1239-1317.
Larson D.J. (1994). Revision of North American Agabus Leach (Coleoptera: Dytiscidae): lutosus-, obsoletus-, and fuscipennis-groups. The Canadian Entomologist 126: 135-181.
Larson D.J. (1996). Revision of North American Agabus Leach (Coleoptera: Dytiscidae): the opacus-group. The Canadian Entomologist 128: 613-665.
Larson D.J. (1997). Revision of North American Agabus Leach (Coleoptera: Dytiscidae): the seriatus-group. The Canadian Entomologist 129: 105-149.
Larson D.J., Alarie Y., Roughley R.E. (2000) Predaceous diving beetles (Coleoptera: Dytiscidae) of the Nearctic Region, with emphasis on the fauna of Canada and Alaska. Ottawa: NRC Research Press. .
Larson, D.J. & Nilsson, A.N. (1985) The Holarctic species of Agabus (sensu lato) Leach (Coleoptera: Dystiscidae). The Canadian Entomologist 117: 119-130.
Larson D.J. & Wolfe R.W. (1998). Revision of North American Agabus (Coleoptera: Dytiscidae): the semivittatus-group. The Canadian Entomologist 130: 27-54.
Nilsson, Anders N. (1982). A key to the identification of the known third-stage larvae of the Fennoscandian species of the genus Agabus (Coleoptera: Dytiscidae). Entomologica Scandinavica 13 (3): 333-338.
Nilsson, Anders N. (1986) Life cycle and habitats of the northern European Agabini (Coleoptera: Dytiscidae). Entomologica Basiliensia 11: 391-417, 1986.
Nilsson, Anders N. (1987) A key to the first instar larvae of Fennoscandian Agabus Leach (Coleoptera, Dytiscidae). Fauna Norvegica, Series B 34 (2): 131-137.
Nilsson, Anders N. (1992) A revision of Afrotropical Agabus Leach (Coleoptera, Dytiscidae), and the evolution of tropicoalpine super specialists. Systematic Entomology 17 (2), 155-179.
Nilsson, Anders N. (2000) A new view on the generic classification of the Agabus-group of genera of the Agabini, aimed at solving the problem with a paraphyletic Agabus (Coleoptera: Dytiscidae). Koleopterologische Rundschau 70: 17–36.

External links

Genus Agabus Leach, 1817 (Coleoptera, Dytiscidae) (atlas of beetles of Russia)

 
Dytiscidae genera
Taxa named by William Elford Leach